Košarkaški klub Sloboda, commonly referred to as KK Sloboda Užice, is a men's professional basketball club based in Užice, Serbia. The club currently participates in the Basketball League of Serbia. The team play domestic home matches in the Veliki Park Sports Hall.

History
The story began in November 1949 when a group of high school students become interested in basketball. Soon they played two friendly matches, and in January 1950 the first basketball tournament was held in Titovo Užice. Same year two basketball sections were formed, one at the City Gymnastic Society, and the other at the Sports Association "Prvi partizan". Later on, the basketball players from the City Gymnastics Society moved to the Sports Association "Sloboda" to form a new basketball section. Also, female team was formed then. In 1953, basketball section has grown into a Basketball club Sloboda.

The sudden rise of the club begins in 1957. In January 1958, on the traditional basketball tournament organized by the Crvena zvezda, the Sloboda players showed a great perspective. Also, the first time since its inception the club participated in the Basketball Cup of Yugoslavia. Basketball club Sloboda since then has been constantly in the 3rd tier of Yugoslav basketball competition - SR Serbia Republic League.

In 1962 under the patronage of the Copper Mill Sevojno, basketball club changed its name to Sevojno. In 1972 the club changed its name to Raketa, after moving to Rocket Sport Society. Four years later, in 1976 the club changed name in Prvi partizan, which was maintained until 1991. The club's greatest success was the participation in the Yugoslav First Federal League in 1988–89 season. Playing along with the great basketball clubs such as the Partizan Belgrade, Red Star Belgrade, Jugoplastika Split, Cibona Zagreb, Olimpija Ljubljana and many, the club has achieved 11th place.

Due to the dissolution of SFR Yugoslavia, the club continues to compete in the FR Yugoslavia First League. In the 1991–92 season, the club achieved 7th place, but the next season it was relegated. From 1991 to 2006 the club changed its name four times. By 2001, the club was called Užice. Then from 2001 to 2004 - Forma Play Off and from 2004 to 2006 - Gradina. After 53 years since its inception the club has returned to its original name - Sloboda.

In the 2006–07 season club become champion of the Serbian Regional League and achieved promotion to the Basketball League of Serbia B. The club spent two seasons there and due to poor results in second season it has been relegated. In the season 2009–10 the club competed in the Serbian League, but they agreed with the Mašinac to replace rank because of difficult financial situation in Kraljevo. The Sloboda moved to the Basketball League of Serbia and BC Mašinac moved to the Serbian League and received a fee of 5 million dinars.

In his debut season in the highest men's basketball competition in Serbia, the Sloboda has been ranked 9th, with 12 wins and 14 defeats. Next season the club has ranked a place lower than last year with 11 wins and 15 defeats. In 2013 the Sloboda achieved a big success in recent club history gaining spot in the 2013 Radivoj Korać Cup quarterfinal against Serbian powerhouse Partizan.

Home arena

The Veliki Park Sports Hall is a multi-purpose indoor arena located in Užice and it has a capacity of 2,200 seats.

Supporters
The organized supporters of the Sloboda Užice sports association are known as the Freedom Fighters. Besides a football club, they also support the Sloboda basketball team.

Players

Current roster

Coaches 

  Slobodan Janković (1990–1991)
  Petar Rodić (1991–1992)
  Slobodan Janković (1992–1993)
  Ivan Obućina (1994–1995)
  Aleksandar Aćimović (2000–2001)
  Miroslav Radošević (2010–2011)
  Miloš Obrenović (2011–2012)
  Vladimir Đokić (2012–2013)
  Mladen Šekularac (2015–2016)
  Vladimir Lučić (2017–2020)
  Oliver Popović (2020–present)

Trophies and awards

Trophies
Yugoslav Federal B League (2nd tier)
Winner (1): 1987–88
Serbian Second League (2nd tier)
Winner (1): 2017–18
Serbian Regional League (3rd tier)
Winner (1): 2006–07

International record

References

External links
 Facebook Page
 Team Profile at eurobasket.com
 Team Profile at realgm.com
 Team Statistics at Srbija Sport

Basketball teams in Serbia
Sport in Užice
Basketball teams established in 1950
Basketball teams in Yugoslavia
1950 establishments in Serbia